Debbie Leung is a University Research Chair at the Institute for Quantum Computing at the University of Waterloo, where she is also affiliated with the Department of Combinatorics and Optimization. She works in theoretical quantum information processing.

Leung's research areas include quantum cryptography, quantum communication, measurement-based quantum computation, fault-tolerant quantum computation and error correction.

Leung earned her Bachelor of Science in mathematics and physics from Caltech in 1995. She received her PhD under doctoral advisors Yoshihisa Yamamoto and Isaac Chuang at Stanford.  In her PhD thesis, entitled "Towards Robust Quantum Computation", she demonstrated the surprising result that approximate quantum error-correcting codes can outperform their exact counterparts. 

In 2002, Leung won the Tolman postdoctoral fellowship at the Institute of Quantum Information at Caltech and the Croucher Fellowship. In 2005, she won a 10-year Tier II Canada Research Chair in Quantum Communications. Her recent work focuses on quantum channel capacities, quantum network coding, and quantum information processing with limited entanglement.

References

External links

21st-century Canadian mathematicians
Canadian women mathematicians
Academic staff of the University of Waterloo
Quantum cryptography
Year of birth missing (living people)
Living people
Stanford University alumni
California Institute of Technology alumni